George Drylie is a former association football player who represented New Zealand at an international level.

Drylie made a single appearance in an official international match for New Zealand, which resulted in a 0–6 loss to South Africa on 5 July 1947.

References 

Year of birth missing (living people)
Living people
New Zealand association footballers
New Zealand international footballers
Stop Out players
Association footballers not categorized by position